Mohammadabad (also Romanized as Moḩammadābād; also known as Moḩammadābād Arāẕī) is a village in Baqerabad Rural District, in the Central District of Mahallat County, Markazi Province, Iran. At the 2006 census, its population was 203, in 49 families.

References 

Populated places in Mahallat County